Egnatia Odos may refer to:

 The Via Egnatia, an ancient Roman road in the southern Balkans
 Egnatia Odos (modern road), Greek National Road 2, partly following the same route as the Via Egnatia
Egnatia Street, Thessaloniki, a street in Thessaloniki